Leonard Sidney Eacott  (born 14 June 1947) is a retired Australian Anglican bishop, army chaplain and military officer, who served as Anglican Bishop to the Australian Defence Force from 2007 to 2012.

Early life, parish ministry and military career
Eacott was born in Toowoomba and grew up in regional Queensland.

Eacott enlisted in the Royal Australian Infantry Corps of the Citizens Military Forces in November 1966, and from 1968 to 1972 fulfilled a national service commitment. In early 1972, Eacott was commissioned as a General Service Officer (Royal Australian Infantry) in the Army Reserve, serving with 25 Battalion, the Royal Queensland Regiment and the Queensland University Regiment. He was also employed as a soil conservation field officer by the Queensland Department of Primary Industries until commencing training for Anglican ministry in 1980.

Eacott is a graduate of St Francis' Theological College and the University of Queensland and initially served in rural and city parish ministry and part-time army chaplaincy with the Army Reserve in Southern Queensland before transferring to full-time chaplaincy with the Royal Australian Army Chaplains' Department.

As part of his military service as a chaplain, Eacott served as Anglican chaplain to the 3rd Brigade, Townsville, deployed in 1993 with the United Nations Transitional Authority in Cambodia, the Land Warfare Centre, Canungra. From 1996 to 1999 he served as senior chaplain to 1 Division at the Deployable Joint Force Headquarters at Enoggera. In 1999-2000 Eacott served as Senior Chaplain to the International Force in East Timor under General Sir Peter Cosgrove, during which time he was involved with the exhumation and reburial of bodies suspected as being victims of crimes against humanity and established and maintained a burial register. He also served as Senior Chaplain to the Logistic Support Force and Command Chaplain to Land Headquarters in Sydney.

On 1 March 2002, Eacott was collated as archdeacon to the Australian Army and on 18 November 2002 was appointed as principal chaplain to the Australian Army (Director General of Chaplaincy - Army), a position which he held until 21 January 2007. He retired from the Australian Regular Army on 15 June 2007.

Episcopal ministry
In May 2007, Eacott was appointed by the Primate of the Anglican Church and Chief of the Defence Force as Anglican Bishop to the Australian Defence Force, replacing Bishop Tom Frame. He was consecrated as bishop and installed on 29 June 2007.

Eacott retired on 31 December 2012 after reaching the retirement age of 65 years and was succeeded by Bishop Ian Lambert.

Publications

Awards and personal life
Eacott is married to Sandy and has three children, one of whom died from cancer in 1995.

Eacott was awarded the Reserve Force Decoration in 1987. Eacott was appointed as a Member of the Order of Australia (Military Division) in the 2007 Australia Day Honours for "exceptional service and outstanding devotion to duty as Principal Chaplain - Army and Head of Corps, Royal Australian Army Chaplains' Department".

References

1947 births
21st-century Anglican bishops in Australia
Anglican bishops to the Australian Defence Force
Australian Anglican bishops
Australian Army chaplains
Australian Army officers
Australian military personnel of the International Force for East Timor
Living people
Members of the Order of Australia